Universal numbers can refer to:

 Universal Numbering System
 universal numbers (data format)